Courtney Rumbolt (born 26 July 1969) is a British bobsledder who competed during the 1990s. He won a bronze medal in the four-man event at Nagano in 1998.

References
 Bobsleigh four-man Olympic medalists for 1924, 1932-56, and since 1964
 DatabaseOlympics.com profile

1969 births
Sportspeople from London
Bobsledders at the 1998 Winter Olympics
British male bobsledders
Olympic bobsledders of Great Britain
Olympic bronze medallists for Great Britain
Living people
Olympic medalists in bobsleigh
Medalists at the 1998 Winter Olympics
British male sprinters
English male sprinters